Gopala Dynasty (Gopal Bansha) was a first dynasty of Nepal founded by Gopa (Yadava) in the Kathmandu Valley. The Lunar dynasty is the origin of the Gopala. The Kings of Gopala Bansha ruled over Nepal for 505 years. It was replaced by rulers of Mahisapala dynasty. Both the Krishna and Mahisapalas have connections to the Gopalas.

There were eight kings of this dynasty Bhuktaman was the first and Yaksha Gupta was the last king.

Origin and History
According to legendary accounts, the early dynasty of Nepal was the Gopala Dynasty established by Gopa, who presumably ruled for about five centuries. They are said to have been followed by the Mahisapala dynasty. The Gopalas and the Mahisapalas were together known as Abhiras.

Another belief was that Gopalvamsi and Mahispalvamsi belonged to the same dynasty and they were divided into two on the basis of their profession. Amarakosha gives Abhira as synonym for Gopa.

List of Rulers
The 8 rulers of the Gopala dynasty include : 

Bhuktamangupta
Jayagupta
Paramagupta
Harshagupta
Bhimagupta
Manigupta
Vishnugupta
Yakchhyagupta

Pashupatinath Temple

The Kings of Gopala Dynasty are credited with the Temple restoration of Vedic Deity Pashupatinath on the Pashupatinath volcanic mound in Nepal, which became the location of the Pashupatinath Temple.

The Kings of Gopala Dynasty were devotees of Lord Shiva.

See also
Mahisapala dynasty
Abhira-Gupta dynasty (Nepal)

References

Archaeology of Nepal
Dynasties of Nepal
Ancient Nepal
Former countries in South Asia